NXC may refer to:

 nxc, NX technology library
 Namco × Capcom, a turn-based strategy console game
 Not eXactly C, a high level language, similar to C, built on top of the Next Byte Codes compiler
 , Nuveen California Select Tax-Free Income Portfolio
 National Express Coaches
 National Express Coventry